Jake Lindsey (born June 21, 1986) is an American mixed martial artist who competes in the Lightweight division. A professional since 2010, he has fought in the UFC, Bellator, the Legacy Fighting Alliance, and Titan FC.

Background
Lindsey was born and raised in Manhattan, Kansas. He attended Kansas State University before beginning training in mixed martial arts in early 2007.

Mixed martial arts career

Early career
Lindsey competed as an amateur with an undefeated 7–0 record before making his professional debut in 2010 competing for various regional promotions across the Midwest. He was able to compile a record of 9–0, before signing with the UFC in early 2014.

Ultimate Fighting Championship 
Lindsey made his promotional debut as a short notice replacement for an injured Yosdenis Cedeno and faced Jon Tuck on June 7, 2014 at UFC Fight Night 42.  After a competitive first two rounds, Lindsey was defeated by submission in the third round as he tapped to a series of heel strikes to the ribs.

Lindsey faced Olivier Aubin-Mercier on October 4, 2014 at UFC Fight Night 54.  After a fairly even first round, Aubin-Mercier won the bout via submission in the second round, as he was able to lock an inverted triangle on Lindsey and get the tap while applying a kimura.

Lindsey faced promotional newcomer Joseph Duffy on March 14, 2015 at UFC 185.  He lost the fight via TKO in the first round and was subsequently released from the promotion.

Bare-knuckle boxing
Lindsey was expected to make his bare-knuckle boxing debut at BKFC 11 on July 24, 2020, against Kenny Licea. However, the bout was scrapped as the event was postponed due to the COVID-19 pandemic.

He ultimately made his debut against Eric Thompson at BKFC Fight Night: Wichita on October 23, 2021. He won the fight via third-round technical knockout.

Championships and accomplishments
Unified MMA
Unified MMA Catchweight Championship (one time; former)

Victory Fighting Championship
VFC Welterweight Championship (one time; former)
One successful title defense

Mixed martial arts record

|-
|Loss
|align=center|15–11
|Chance Rencountre
|Submission (rear-naked choke)
|FAC 11
|
|align=center|2
|align=center|0:44
|Independence, Missouri, United States
|
|-
|Win
|align=center|15–10
|Fernando Martinez
|Submission (rear-naked choke)
|FAC 9
|
|align=center|1
|align=center|3:41
|Independence, Missouri, United States
|
|-
|Loss
|align=center|14–10
|Jason High
|TKO (punches)
|FAC 5
|
|align=center|5
|align=center|0:20
|Independence, Missouri, United States
|
|-
|Loss
|align=center|14–9
|Julien Williams
|Decision (unanimous)
|Never Surrender MMA
|
|align=center|3
|align=center|5:00
|Salina, Kansas, United States
|
|-
|Win
|align=center|14–8
|Pat Pytlik
|Technical Submission (guillotine choke)
|Unified MMA 36: Mayhem
|
|align=center|2
|align=center|3:25
|Enoch, Alberta, Canada
|
|-
|Win
|align=center|13–8
|Dawond Pickney
|Submission (guillotine choke)
|EFC: Evolution Fighting Championship 10
|
|align=center|1
|align=center|2:31
|Mulvane, Kansas, United States
|
|-
|Loss
|align=center|12–8
|Jason Witt
|Decision (unanimous)
|Cageside Promotions/KCFA 25
|
|align=center|3
|align=center|5:00
|Independence, Missouri, United States
|
|-	
|Loss
|align=center|12–7
|David Michaud
|TKO (injury)
|Legacy Fighting Alliance Fight Night 1
|
|align=center| 3
|align=center| 1:14
|Sioux Falls, South Dakota, United States
|
|-
|Win
|align=center|12-6
|Aaron Highfill
|Decision (unanimous)
|Shamrock FC: Shamrock 286
|
|align=center|3
|align=center|5:00
|St. Louis, Missouri, United States
| 
|-
|Loss
|align=center|11–6
|Chance Rencountre
|Decision (split)
|Bellator 171
|
|align=center| 3
|align=center| 5:00
|Mulvane, Kansas, United States
|
|-
|Loss
|align=center|11–5
|Dakota Cochrane
|Submission (guillotine choke)
|VFC 55
|
|align=center|1
|align=center|0:53
|Topeka, Kansas, United States
|
|-
|Win
|align=center|11–4
| Zak Bucia
|TKO (knee and punches)
|VFC 50
|
|align=center|3
|align=center|1:26
|Topeka, Kansas, United States
|
|-	
|Loss
|align=center|10–4
|Dakota Cochrane
|Submission (guillotine choke)
|VFC 47
|
|align=center|3
|align=center|3:43
|Omaha, Nebraska, United States
|
|-
|Win
|align=center|10–3
| Ian Stonehouse 
|Submission (rear-naked choke)
|VFC Fight Night 6
|
|align=center|2
|align=center|2:15
|Junction City, Kansas, United States
|
|-	
|Loss
|align=center|9–3
|Joseph Duffy
|TKO (head kick and body punch)
|UFC 185
|
|align=center|1
|align=center|1:47
|Dallas, Texas, United States
|
|-
| Loss
|align=center| 9–2
|Olivier Aubin-Mercier
| Submission (inverted triangle kimura)
|UFC Fight Night: MacDonald vs. Saffiedine
|
|align=center|2
|align=center|3:22
|Halifax, Nova Scotia, Canada
|
|-
| Loss
|align=center| 9–1
|Jon Tuck
|TKO (submission to heel strikes)
|UFC Fight Night: Henderson vs. Khabilov
|
|align=center|3
|align=center|2:47
|Albuquerque, New Mexico, United States
|
|-
| Win
|align=center| 9–0
|Ted Worthington
| TKO (punches)
|VFC: Junction City 5
|
|align=center|1
|align=center|4:54
|Junction City, Kansas, United States
|
|-
| Win
|align=center| 8–0
|Zach Freeman
| KO (punches)
|Titan Fighting Championship 25
|
|align=center|1
|align=center|2:31
|Fort Riley, Kansas, United States
|
|-
| Win
|align=center| 7–0
|Marcio Navarro
| KO (punch)
|VFC: Wichita 1
|
|align=center|1
|align=center|2:12
|Wichita, Kansas, United States
|Defended the VFC Welterweight Championship.
|-
| Win
|align=center| 6–0
|Darion Terry
| Submission (punches)
|VFC: Junction City 3
|
|align=center|2
|align=center|2:06
|Junction City, Kansas, United States
|Won the vacant VFC Welterweight Championship.
|-
| Win
|align=center| 5–0
|Jordan Johnson
| Decision (unanimous)
|Titan Fighting Championship 23
|
|align=center|3
|align=center|5:00
|Fort Riley, Kansas, United States
|
|-
| Win
|align=center| 4–0
|William de Souza
| Submission (rear-naked choke)
|VFC: Junction City 2
|
|align=center|1
|align=center|3:59
|Junction City, Kansas, United States
|
|-
| Win
|align=center| 3–0
|Danny Black
| Submission (rear-naked choke)
|VFC: Junction City 2
|
|align=center|1
|align=center|1:49
|Junction City, Kansas, United States
|
|-
| Win
|align=center| 2–0
|Beto Serrano
| KO (punch)
|VFC 34
|
|align=center|2
|align=center|0:20
|Council Bluffs, Iowa, United States
|
|-
| Win
|align=center| 1–0
|Bobby Cooper
| Decision (unanimous)
|Eye Win: Devastation
|
|align=center|3
|align=center|5:00
|Wichita, Kansas, United States
|
|-

Bare-knuckle boxing record

|-
|Win
|align=center|4–0
|Connor Tierney	
|KO (punches)
|BKFC 37
|
|align=center|5
|align=center|1:02
|London, England
|
|-
|Win
|align=center|3–0
|Brandon Girtz	
|TKO (doctor stoppage)
|BKFC 31
|
|align=center|2
|align=center|2:00
|Broomfield, Colorado, United States
|
|-
|Win
|align=center|2–0
|Derrick Findley	
|TKO (corner stoppage)
|BKFC 23
| 
|align=center|4
|align=center|2:00
|Wichita, Kansas, United States
|
|-
|Win
|align=center|1–0
|Eric Thompson
|KO (punch)
|BKFC Fight Night: Wichita
|
|align=center|3
|align=center|1:00
|Wichita, Kansas, United States
|
|-

See also
 List of current UFC fighters
 List of male mixed martial artists

References

External links

Living people
1986 births
American male mixed martial artists
People from Manhattan, Kansas
Mixed martial artists from Kansas
Lightweight mixed martial artists
Ultimate Fighting Championship male fighters